Enteromius tegulifer is a species of ray-finned fish in the genus Enteromius which is endemic to Cameroon.

References
 

Endemic fauna of Cameroon
Enteromius
Taxa named by Henry Weed Fowler
Fish described in 1936